Zhong Lun Law Firm is a multinational law firm headquartered in Beijing, China. It was founded in 1993 as one of the first private law firms approved by the Ministry of Justice of the People's Republic of China.

Zhong Lun Law Firm currently has domestic offices in Beijing, Shanghai, Shenzhen, Guangzhou, Chengdu, Wuhan, Chongqing, Qingdao, Hangzhou, Nanjing and Haikou, and international offices in London, Tokyo, Hong Kong,  New York City, San Francisco, Los Angeles and Almaty.

Name
In Chinese Zhong Lun (中伦) means compliance with ethical principles. The term first appeared in the Analects of Confucius.

History
Zhong Lun Law Firm was founded in Beijing in 1993 as a private partnership. In 1996, it merged with the Beijing-based law firm Jintong and changed its name to Zhonglun Jintong. In 2003, a group of Zhonglun Jintong partners left to set up a new firm named Zhonglun W&D. Zhonglun Jintong rebranded itself as Zhong Lun in 2008.

Zhong Lun's office in Wuhan was opened in January 2010. Zhong Lun's office in Hong Kong was opened in February 2010, in an association with the Hong Kong-based law firm Roger Ho & Co. In 2011 Zhong Lun's Hong Kong office merged with the Hong Kong-based law firm Boughton Peterson Yang Anderson. Zhong Lun's opened an office in London in February 2012 following the recruitment of the entire London staff of Zhonglun W&D.

In April 2013, Zhong Lun opened a New York Office in Midtown Manhattan, with Ta-kuang (T.K.) Chang and Philip Xuan Zhang as founding partners.

In February 2014, at the Chambers Asia Pacific Awards for Excellence 2014, Zhong Lun was chosen as PRC Law Firm of the Year by Chambers & Partners.

On June 19, 2014, Zhong Lun was awarded the Gold Award as the “Best Chinese Law Firm” by the International Legal Alliance Summit & Awards (ILASA).
 
On September 22, 2016, China Law & Practice awarded to Zhong Lun its Grand Prize: China  Firm of the Year.

Main practice areas
Zhong Lun's main practice areas include:

Real Estate;
Capital Markets/Securities;
Private Equity & Investment Funds
Corporate/Foreign Direct Investment
Mergers & Acquisitions
Banking and Finance
Dispute Resolution
Intellectual Property
Construction & Infrastructure
Antitrust/Competition
WTO/International Trade
Overseas Investments
Labor and Employment
Taxation & Wealth Management
Securitization & Financial Products
Bankruptcy & Reorganization
Hospitality
Technology, Media and Telecoms and Entertainment
Regulatory/Anti-bribery
Environmental, Energy and Natural Resources
Shipping

See also 
Legal History of China
Chinese law

References

External links
Zhong Lun

Law firms of China
Law firms established in 1993